Tous is a Spanish jewelry, accessories and fashion retailer which was founded by Salvador Tous Blavi and Teresa Ponsa Mas. It is based in Catalonia, Spain.

History 

In 1920, Salvador Tous Blavi and his wife Teresa Ponsa Mas opened a small watch repair workshop that progressively grew in prominence in the jewelry industry. In 1965, Salvador Tous, the son of the founder, married Rosa Oriol — the pair pooled their talents, experience and creativity for the purpose of designing a new style of jewelry. At present, the brand name has more than 400 stores in 45 countries, and in cities such as New York City, Paris, Madrid, Moscow, Milan and Tokyo, among others.

Since 1920, TOUS has created jewelry as the company's core-business, but also produces a broad range of accessories, such as bags, watches, perfumes, eyeglasses, textiles and small leather goods. As of 2012, the company produces 30 annual collections.

Contemporary era

There was a national expansion during the 1980s. The Tous’ four daughters — Rosa, Alba, Laura and Marta — subsequently joined the family business.

For the first time, the company has collaborated with Eugenia Martinez de Irujo, the daughter of the Duchess of Alba. Consolidated over numerous years, the working relationship with the Duchess of Montoro, which is her title, has led to the development of a signature collection; "Iluminada", "Leyendas" and "Cercle" are some of her recent product releases.

In the 1990s, the international expansion began with the opening of the brand's first store in Japan; countries like Mexico and the United States followed.
Kylie Minogue has been one of several celebrity “images” of the brand name and have contributed to consolidating TOUS' international popularity. In 2011, TOUS chose Jennifer Lopez as the image for its Spring–Summer campaign. In this same year, TOUS also launched a special collaboration with Manolo Blahnik for the creation of the "Manolo Blahnik for TOUS" collection; the collaborative release consisted of pendants that are a faithful reproduction, in gold and in silver, of the famous “Campari” shoe.

The company's estimated sales (in 2010/2011) were €450 million in total sales and €30 million in watches.

Causes
In 2012, TOUS is listed as a partner of the (RED) campaign, together with other brands such as Nike, Inc., Girl, American Express and Converse.  The campaign's mission is to prevent the transmission of the HIV from mother to child by 2015 (the campaign's byline is "Fighting For An AIDS Free Generation").

See also
 Art jewelry
 List of jewelry types
 Jewelry cleaning

References

Companies based in Catalonia
Fashion accessory brands
Jewellery companies of Spain
Spanish brands
Spanish companies established in 1920